Ami Klin is an American psychologist who studies autism. He is the first chief of autism and related disorders at the Marcus Autism Center, a wholly owned subsidiary of Children’s Healthcare of Atlanta. Klin will also be a Georgia Research Alliance Eminent Scholar at Emory University and director of the Division of Autism and Related Developmental Disabilities in the Department of Pediatrics at the Emory University School of Medicine.

Background and education
Previously, he was an autism and Asperger syndrome researcher and a Harris Professor of Child Psychology and Psychiatry at the Yale Child Study Center. Klin has worked at the Center since 1989.  He obtained  BA degrees in Psychology, and Political Science and History, from the Hebrew University of Jerusalem, Israel in 1983 and his PhD in Psychology at University College London in 1988 under the co-supervision of Uta Frith.  He is board-certified in Clinical Psychology.

Awards
Klin has received numerous professional and academic awards and recognition including Researcher of the Year from Business New Haven in collaboration with Yale, Pearl H. Rieger Award for Excellence in Clinical Science from the Rush Medical Center in Chicago, and the Robert McKenzie Prize for Outstanding PhD Thesis from the University of London.

Publications
Klin has published research in numerous medical journals and is the author (or co-author) of the books:
Asperger Syndrome (2000)
Autism Spectrum Disorders in Infants and Toddlers: Diagnosis, Assessment, and Treatment (2008, ASIN 001EHEBBM)
 Handbook of Autism and Pervasive Developmental Disorders, Diagnosis, Development, Neurobiology, and Behavior (Volume 1) (2005)
Handbook of Autism and Pervasive Developmental Disorders, Assessment, Interventions, and Policy (Volume 2) (2005)
The Autistic Spectrum: A Parents' Guide to Understanding and Helping Your Child (2001)

Lectures
Klin was the keynote speaker at the 14th Annual Alabama Autism Conference on February 27, 2015. His lecture was Bringing Science to the Community: A New System of Healthcare Delivery for Infants and Toddlers with Autism Spectrum Disorders.

References

External links
Ami Klin & Warren Jones: Melding art and science for autism

Autism researchers
Yale University faculty
Living people
Alumni of the London School of Economics
Year of birth missing (living people)